This is a list of monuments in the former Nawalparasi District, Nepal as officially recognized by and available through the website of the Department of Archaeology, Nepal.

Nawalparasi was a district in western Nepal. It was divided in 2015 into Nawalpur District (in Gandaki Province) and Parasi District (in Lumbini Province).

List of monuments

|}

See also 
 List of monuments in Gandaki Province
 List of monuments in Lumbini Province
 List of monuments in Nepal

References 

Nawalparasi
Nawalparasi District